The African Regroupment Party was a political party in the French African colonies.

Formation
The PRA came into being at a meeting in Paris on March 26, 1958, months before the French Community would replace the French Union. The main founding organizations were the African Convention and the African Socialist Movement. Other parties that assisted the Paris meeting included the African Bloc of Guinea, Social Party of the Masses (Gabon), Republican Union of Côte des Somalis (Djibouti), Dahomeyan Democratic Rally and the Voltaic Democratic Movement.

Initially there was hope that the African Democratic Rally (RDA) would join the project and Sékou Touré had signed the appeal on behalf of RDA calling for the formation of the party, but Félix Houphouët-Boigny intervened to keep his party outside. The African Independence Party (PAI) attended the Paris meeting, but declined to merge into PRA. PAI advocated full independence, a demand that PRA at that point was not willing to raise.

PRA held its constitutive congress in Cotonou July 25–27 1958. PRA strove to create an independent federation out of the French colonies in Africa.

1958 Referendum and after
During the referendum of 1958 PRA advocated full independence. This led to a collision course between PRA and its Senegalese section, the Senegalese Progressive Union (UPS). The result was a split in UPS, and the formation of African Regroupment Party-Senegal (PRA-Sénégal).

In Côte d'Ivoire the party came into conflict with the Democratic Party of Côte d'Ivoire (PDCI), and the PRA leadership was exiled to Conakry. There it became the nucleus of Ivorian opposition, such as the National Liberation Committee of Côte d'Ivoire (CNLCI).

In Upper Volta the Voltaic Solidarity group (PSEMA, MDV and MPA) joined PRA. The PRA section disappeared as the country became a single-party state in 1960, but the African Regroupment Party of Upper Volta, a group claiming to be the inheritors of PRA, emerged following the coup in 1966.

References

Gbagbo, Laurent: Côte d'Ivoire, Pour une alternative démocratique. Paris: L'Harmattan, 1983.
Englebert, Pierre. La Revolution Burkinabè. Paris: L'Harmattan, 1986.
Zuccarelli, François. La vie politique sénégalaise (1940-1988). Paris: CHEAM, 1988.

1958 establishments in French West Africa
African and Black nationalist parties in Africa
Pan-African organizations
Pan-Africanist political parties in Africa
Political parties established in 1958
Political parties in French West Africa
Political parties with year of disestablishment missing
Transnational political parties